Schistura machensis is a species of ray-finned fish, a stone loach in the genus Schistura, from Pakistan.

Footnotes 
 

M
Fish described in 1970
Taxa named by Teodor T. Nalbant